The Persian-Uzbek wars were a series of conflicts between the Shaybanids and Safavid Iran of Persia fought between 1502 and 1510.  The Safavid dynasty prevailed.

Wars 

In 1502, shortly after Muhammad Shaybani defeated an invasion by the Ferghanan ruler Babur, Persian emperor Ismail I conquered the rest of Iran. Shaybani and his horsemen began to raid the Timurid Empire, which was a great superpower founded by the ruthless Timur in the late 14th century. Badi al Zaman appealed to the shah of Persia for help, and Ismail went to war with the Shaybanids.

Shaybani captured the Timurid southern capital at Herat in 1507, and then Shaybani went to war with the Kazakh Khanate in the north. Meanwhile, Badi sought asylum in the Persian Empire. Ismail and the Timurid army combined their forces and prepared to face the Uzbeks' army. At the Battle of Marv, the allied army beat off the Shaybanids, and Shaybani was killed trying to flee. This marked the end of the Shaybanid Empire and the wars between the Persian Empire and Shaybani.

Aftermath 

The Timurid dynasty was conquered by Babur from 1510 to 1525, and Babur seized power as the ruler. In 1526, Babur invaded India and expanded the Timurids, which in India became known as the Mughal Empire.

Conflicts in 1502
Conflicts in 1510
Conflicts in 1507
Conflicts in 1506
Conflicts in 1508
Wars involving Safavid Iran
1500s in Asia
1510 in Asia
1502 in Asia